Kambel-e Soleyman (also Romanized as Kambel-e Soleymān; also known as Kambal, Kambel, and Kambel-e Bālā) is a village in Kambel-e Soleyman Rural District, in the Central District of Chabahar County, Sistan and Baluchestan Province, Iran. At the 2006 census, its population was 703, in 143 families.

References 

Populated places in Chabahar County